Michał Jan Górski (15 September 1911 – 19 March 1985) was a Polish cross-country skier who competed in the 1936 Winter Olympics. His civil profession was an engineer and architect.

He was born and died in Zakopane.

In 1936 he was a member of the Polish cross-country relay team which finished seventh in the 4x10 km relay event. In the 18 km competition he finished 22nd.

External links
 Profile 

1911 births
1985 deaths
Polish male cross-country skiers
Olympic cross-country skiers of Poland
Cross-country skiers at the 1936 Winter Olympics
Sportspeople from Zakopane
20th-century Polish architects